"Don't Break Me" is a song by Australian singer-songwriter Montaigne, released as a single on 31 January 2020. The song won the second installment of Eurovision - Australia Decides, Australia's national selection for Eurovision on 8 February 2020, and was going to represent Australia at the Eurovision Song Contest 2020, to be held in Rotterdam, before the contest was cancelled due to the COVID-19 pandemic. Montaigne was due to compete in the first semi-final which was meant to be held on 12 May 2020.

Background
Montaigne said "'Don't Break Me' is a depiction of the enough is enough phase of a relationship breakdown, where one person feels like they are putting much more time, energy and resources into the relationship than the other person and becomes frustrated and resentful. I wrote it while reading 'Co-dependent No More' by Melody Beattie, which really informed the qualities of the character and the relationship dynamic."

Eurovision – Australia Decides
Montaigne performed the song wearing a clown costume including a blue wig, and flanked by backing dancers. The song was awarded the most jury points (54) and second highest public televote points (53) for a total of 107, winning Australia's second national selection competition for Eurovision.

Charts

References

2020 singles
2020 songs
Eurovision songs of 2020
Eurovision songs of Australia
Montaigne (musician) songs
Songs written by Anthony Egizii
Songs written by David Musumeci
Song recordings produced by DNA Songs